Elaborations is jazz saxophonist Arthur Blythe's fifth album for the Columbia label, recorded in New York City in 1982.

Reception
The AllMusic review by Scott Yanow states: "This post bop music (which falls between advanced hard bop and the avant-garde) is well worth several listens".

Track listing
All compositions by Arthur Blythe except as indicated
 "Elaborations" - 7:23      
 "Metamorphosis" - 6:18     
 "Sister Daisy" - 7:17    
 "One Mint Julep" (Rudolph Toombs) - 4:54    
 "Shadows" - 4:25     
 "Lower Nile" - 10:37
Recorded at CBS Recording Studios, New York

Personnel
Arthur Blythe - alto saxophone 
Abdul Wadud - cello
Kelvyn Bell - guitar 
Bob Stewart - tuba
Bobby Battle - drums
Wilbur Morris - bass (track 3)
Muhammad Abdullah - congas (track 6)

References

1982 albums
Columbia Records albums
Arthur Blythe albums